The Socialist Party-1 is a socialist political party in Bolivia.

History
The Socialist Party-One took part in the 1978, 1979, and 1980 general elections, running Marcelo Quiroga Santa Cruz and polled 00.43, 04.82 and 08.71 per cent of the vote, respectively. The party won five seats in National Congress in 1979 and eleven in 1980.

Some elements in the conservative military feared Marcelo Quiroga Santa Cruz's potential following as an opposition leader and he was killed during the Luis García Meza Tejada coup of 17 July 1980. His death left his Socialist Party-One – and Bolivian left-wing politics generally – in a greatly weakened condition.

In 1984 the Socialist Party-One absorbed the small ultra-left “Spartacus Revolutionary Movement” (Movimiento Revolucionario Espartaco, MRE), led by Dulfredo Rua.

The Socialist Party-One presented Ramiro Velasco Romero as its candidate in the 1985 elections, but he won only 02.58 per cent of the vote, coming sixth. The party won five seats in National Congress.

In the 1989 elections the Party presented Roger Cortez Hurtado and he won 2.8 per cent of the vote.

In 1993 the Socialist Party-One took part in an electoral coalition United Left backing Ramiro Velasco Romero, a leader of the PS-1. He won only 0.9 per cent of the vote.

There is also a dissident Socialist Party-One-Marcelo Quiroga, led by José María Palacios.

At the legislative elections in 2002, the party won 0.7% of the popular vote and one out of 130 seats in the Chamber of Deputies and no seats in the Senate.

References

1978 establishments in Bolivia
Democratic socialist parties in South America
Political parties established in 1978
Political parties in Bolivia
Socialist parties in Bolivia